The following is a list of notable events and releases that occurred in 2010 in Japanese music.

Events

January

 January 10 – RIAJ certifies pop/dance group Exile's album Aisubeki Mirai e (released December 2009) as a million selling album. Namie Amuro's Past Future received a double platinum certification.
 January 13 – Pop musician Ayumi Hamasaki extends the own record for the artist with most top 10 singles (45), with the release of her single "You Were.../Ballad".
 January 15 – February 12 – Hikaru Utada holds her first tour of the United States/United Kingdom, Utada: In The Flesh 2010.
 January 21 – The second annual CD Shop Taishō awards are announced, with The Bawdies' This Is My Story and Lady Gaga's The Fame winning the grand prizes. The awards are voted on by individual members of the National Japanese CD Shop Employee Union.
 January 22 – Voice actress Nana Mizuki reached #1 on the Oricon single charts with her single "Phantom Minds", making her the first voice actress in charting history to have a #1 single (she broke this record for the album charts in 2009 with Ultimate Diamond).
 January 23 – The mother of Hello! Project/Avex musician Maki Goto, Tokiko Goto, falls from her home and dies. The resulting funeral on January 28 is heavily publicised, with many Hello! Project-associated people attending the funeral.
 January 29 – R&B singer Double announces her return to musical activities, after last year going on hiatus due to illness.
 January 29 – U-ka Saegusa in dB perform their final live, at Big Cat in Osaka.
 January 31 – The first Billboard Japan Music Awards are held in Tokyo, with Exile winning the Artist of the Year award.

February

 February 3 – One Ok Rock release their first single since their hiatus, "Kanzen Kankaku Dreamer." The band went on hiatus in May 2009 due to guitarist Alex's arrest for assault, who is now no longer a member of the band.
 February 10 – RIAJ certifies band Ikimono-gakari's album Hajimari no Uta (released December 2009) as double platinum album.
 February 10 – Rapper You the Rock was arrested for cannabis possession, after 2mgs of dried cannabis, along with related cannabis paraphernalia such as a pipe, were found at his home in Meguro, Tokyo.
 February 15 – R&B singer Shion has her trial for possession/use of the drug ketamine. She pleaded guilty, and was given a one-year sentence, suspended for three years.
 February 22 – Mika Nakashima's song "Always" is the first song released in 2010 to receive a digital certification. It was certified gold by the RIAJ for Chaku-Uta Full (cellphone digital downloads) for the January 2010 period.
 February 23 – AKB48's single "Sakura no Shiori" sells 318,000 copies in its first week, making it the biggest opening sales for a female group single since Morning Musume's "Mr. Moonlight (Ai no Big Band)" in July 2001. This record was later beaten by their single "Ponytail to Chouchou."
 February 23 – Korean boy band Tohoshinki's first greatest hits album, Best Selection 2010, sells 413,000 copies in its first week. This gives the band their first #1 album, as well as breaking the record for the highest first week sales by a foreign group. The previous record holder was Bon Jovi's These Days in 1995, with 379,000 copies.
 February 24 – The 24th Japan Gold Disc Awards are held in Tokyo. Arashi wins the domestic Artist of the Year award, making them the first Johnny's boyband to win this award. Hilcrhyme wins the New Artist of the Year award.
 February 24 – Minori Chihara releases her eight CD single Yasashii Bōkyaku. The song won the Best Singing Award at the fifth annual Seiyu Awards held in 2011 in Tokyo for Chihara's performance.  It is used as the ending theme to the anime film The Disappearance of Haruhi Suzumiya.

March

 March 7 – Idol group Idoling!!! announces five new members to their line-up, after auditions were held on March 6. The new members are Kaoru Gotō (後藤郁), Yūna Itō (伊藤祐奈), Ruka Kurata (倉田瑠夏), Manami Nomoto (野元愛) and Chika Ojima (尾島知佳), all between 13 and 15 years of age. Approximately 5,000 girls auditioned for the group.
 March 9 – Boy band Arashi's "Troublemaker" sells 542,000 copies in its first week, making it the current #1 single of the year.
 March 9 – Kōichi Nakamura (中村耕一), vocalist of the 1980s rock band Jaywalk, was arrested for illegal stimulant possession. The band was put into hiatus, with their 30th anniversary releases/events cancelled and their contract with Warner Music Japan nulled.
 March 10 – RIAJ certifies two albums for double platinum status: Kaela Kimura's 5 Years and Tohoshinki's Best Selection 2010. Both albums are the first to be released in 2010 to receive double platinum certifications.
 March 12 – Kana Nishino's song "Best Friend" tops the RIAJ Digital Track Chart for the third week.
 March 20 – Shonen Knife's drummer Etsuko Nakanishi retires from the band after five years, during the band's 13th Fandango concert (十三ファンダンゴ) in Osaka.
 March 21 – Rock musician Gackt performs the first men's only concert in Kawasaki, Kanagawa.
 March 22 – The 14th Space Shower Music Video Awards are aired. Namie Amuro's "Fast Car" wins the Best Video of the Year Award (as well as Best Art Direction). Ringo Shiina was awarded the Best Artist award (along with the Best Female Video award for her song "Tsugō no Ii Karada.")
 March 24 – Hiro, leader of R&B group Exile, became the centre of a tax enquiry after failing to report approximately ¥300,000,000 in earnings at his entertainment production company LDH. Hiro later stated the discrepancy was unintentional.
 March 25 – Hip-hop/reggae group Spontania add singer Kaori Natori as a permanent female vocalist to their line-up. The band's first release as a three-member group was a digital single, "Now or Never," released 8 days earlier without any indication of the line-up change.
 March 29 – Soh of the band Greeeen passes his National Dentistry Examination exam, making all members of the group certified dentists. Bandmates Hide and 92 passed the exam in 2008, while Navi passed it in 2009.
 March 30 – Akira Akasaka, former member of Johnny's idol group Hikaru Genji, was sentenced to 18 months in prison for using illegal stimulants. His prison sentence was increased to a period of three years, however, due to his previous suspended sentence for possession of stimulants in November 2007.

April

 April 3 – Girl band Maria perform their final live at the Akasaka Blitz, after announcing their plans to disband due to drummer Tattsu suffering from thoracic outlet syndrome.
 April 3 – Avex Management announce the hiatus of Korean boyband Tohoshinki's activities in Japan. The band's solo activities continued, with the Jejung starring drama Sunao ni Narenakute airing in mid April, and Junsu's solo debut single announced for release in May.
 April 9 – Fuyumi Sakamoto tops the RIAJ Digital Track Chart with her song "Mata Kimi ni Koi Shiteru," becoming the first enka singer to achieve this.
 April 10 – Funky Monkey Babys' greatest hits collection, Funky Monkey Babys Best was certified as double platinum by the RIAJ. Arashi's "Troublemaker" becomes the first single released in 2010 to be certified as double platinum. Orianthi's Believe becomes the first non-domestic album to receive a certification (gold).
 April 14 – Johnny's boyband Arashi's DVD Arashi Anniversary Tour 5x10 breaks the first week sales record for a music DVD, with 477,000 copies. Arashi were also the previous record holder, with 5x10 All the Best! Clips 1999–2009 selling 428,000 copies in a week in April 2009.
 April 15 – Rhythm Zone announce a three-member subgroup created from some of the members of boyband Tohoshinki, after the group's hiatus announced earlier in the month. The members, Jejung, Junsu and Yuchun, are the band members who filed a lawsuit against SM Entertainment in 2009.
 April 16 – Japanese media begin levelling accusations against the public relations theme song for Shanghai Expo 2010, "Ėrlíngyīlíng Děng Nǐ Lái" (2010 等你来 2010 Right Here Waiting for You), as being plagiarised from a 1997 song by Mayo Okamoto, "Sono Mama no Kimi de Ite." The executive committee for the event later admitted the song had been plagiarised by the songwriter Miao Senshi (繆森氏), and Okamoto gave permission for the rights for her song to be used.
 April 17 – The music video is from Uverworld's single, "Gold," is premiered today, making it the first 3D music video released by a Japanese artist.
 April 20 – Kana Nishino's song "Best Friend" becomes the first song released in 2010 to receive a double platinum digital certification. The song had been downloaded over 500,000 times as a ringtone (Chaku-Uta) since its release in late February.
 April 27 – Kazumasa Oda's greatest hits album Jiko Best charts for its 400th week, since its release in 2002. As of 2010, no other album has charted long enough to reach this milestone.

May

 May 3 – The Underneath perform their final concert as "The Underneath," at the Shibuya O-West, before changing their band name to Defspiral.
 May 3 – Hello! Project group Melon Kinenbi hold their final concert Nakano Sun Plaza, before disbanding. The group celebrated their 10th anniversary earlier in the year.
 May 4 – The second theme songs for the anime K-On!, "Go! Go! Maniac" and "Listen!!" (performed by the fictional band Ho-kago Tea Time) reached #1 and #2 respectively on Oricon's single charts. This is the first time that a release credited to anime characters has topped the singles charts.
 May 4 – Lady Gaga becomes the first Western artist to have two albums in the top 10 in 18 years, with The Fame Monster and The Remix. This last time this happened was with Bruce Springsteen's Human Touch and Lucky Town in 1992.
 May 5 – The first music composition by Avex songwriter Tetsuya Komuro is released since his fraud case in 2008. He wrote the music for the songs on pop group AAA's single "Aitai Riyū/Dream After Dream (Yume Kara Sameta Yume)."
 May 10 – The Brilliant Green announces at their official sit the leaving of guitarist Ryo Matsui from the band's line-up. The band plans to continue on as a duo.
 May 12 – RIAJ certifies Lady Gaga's album The Fame (released May 2009) as double platinum album. The previous Western album to be certified so highly was Michael Jackson's King of Pop (Japan Edition) in November 2009.
 May 14 – Oricon reports that Kobukuro's 2006 greatest hits album All Singles Best achieves the sales of over three million copies, becoming the first album to do so in 7 years 10 months since Southern All Stars' 1998 album Umi no Yeah!! in 2002.
 May 19 – Namie Amuro receives the award for best selling Asian artist at the 2010 World Music Awards.
 May 21 – Kana Nishino's "Aitakute Aitakute" reaches #1 on the RIAJ Digital Track Chart, making this Nishino's fourth consecutive #1 song on the chart. Because of this, Nishino becomes the artist with most #1 songs on the chart, as well as becoming the artist with most weeks at #1 (with seven weeks in total).
 May 22 – Erika Sawajiri returns to the music scene, with a performance at the fashion and music event Girls Award 2010 held at the Yoyogi National Gymnasium. She had been on hiatus for two and a half years, due to the controversy around her comments at a press conference for the film Closed Note.
 May 25 – Boyband Arashi's single "Monster" sells 543,000 copies in its first week, making it the biggest selling first week of a single in 2010. The single beat out the sales of the group's previous single, "Troublemaker," by only 1,000 copies.
 May 25 – Exit Tunes Presents Vocalogenesis feat. Hatsune Miku becomes the first vocaloid album to top the Oricon weekly charts.
 May 28 – Rapper Sticky of the Japanese hip-hop group Scars was arrested for possession of 30 grams of cannabis, found at his home in Kawasaki.
 May 29 – The 9th MTV Video Music Awards Japan are held at the Yoyogi National Gymnasium. Exile's "Futatsu no Kuchibiru" won the award for the best video of 2009. Other major awards went to Shota Shimizu's "Utsukushii Hibi yo," Namie Amuro's "Fast Car" and Tohoshinki's "Share the World."

June

 June 1 – Idol group AKB48's single "Ponytail to Chouchou" sells 513,000 copies in its first week, becoming the biggest first week for a female idol single since Morning Musume's "Ren'ai Revolution 21" in 2000, and the biggest first week for a female artist since Hikaru Utada's "Can You Keep a Secret?" in 2001.
 June 1 – Boyband Tohoshinki member Xiah Junsu's single "Xiah" sells 195,000 copies in its first week, becoming the biggest first week sales of the year by a solo artist.
 June 4 – July 13 – Visual kei metal band Versailles embark on their first world tour, with dates in South America and Europe. The band have previously performed single concerts in the US in 2008.
 June 10 – RIAJ certifies Hideaki Tokunaga's album Vocalist 4 as double platinum, and his album Vocalist (released September 2005) as a million selling album.
 June 13 – Misia performs her song "Maware Maware" from the 2010 FIFA World Cup official album Listen Up! The Official 2010 FIFA World Cup Album at the Nelson Mandela Square in Johannesburg, and also unveils a 3D music video for the song.
 June 13 – Surface disband at their final concert at the Tokyo International Forum.
 June 15 – Kaela Kimura reaches #1 on Oricon's single charts with her song "Ring a Ding Dong," making this the first time she has topped the single charts since she debuted in 2004.
 June 19–20 – Jin Akanishi, member of the boyband KAT-TUN, performed three concerts in Los Angeles as a part of his You & Jin solo tour. This is the first solo performance by a Johnny's artist in the US. Further concerts over the United States are planned for September and October. Consequently, Akanishi did not attend KAT-TUN's Asian tour.
 June 20 – Kaela Kimura's song "Ring a Ding Dong" is certified by the RIAJ for 1,000,000 ringtone downloads between its release date, May 26, and the end of May.
 June 25 – Ai Otsuka married RIP SLYME member SU. The announcement of the marriage had been released on her official website on June 26.
 June 28 – Otonamode will play their final live with their current line-up. After this date, vocalist/guitarist Keita Takahashi will continue on as the band's lead, however with different members.

July
 July 1–4 – Many Japanese artists plan to perform at Anime Expo in Los Angeles, including AKB48 and RSP on July 1, May'n, Megumi Nakajima and I've singer Mell on July 2, Beni and rock band Sophia on July 3.
 July 1–4 – Many Japanese artists plan to perform at Japan Expo in Paris, including Doping Panda on July 1, C-Zone and Morning Musume on July 2, Vivid on both July 2 and 3, Long Shot Party on July 3, and Seikima-II and X Japan members Toshi and Yoshiki on July 4.
 July 15 – Daisuke Ochida, former vocalist of visual kei bands Kagerou and the studs dies at the age of 31.
 July 16–24 – Gackt plans to tour Europe for the first time in his career, with dates in England, France, Germany and Spain planned.
 July 30 – August 1 – The Fuji Rock Festival is planned to be held over three days.
July 31 – August 28 – Johnny & Associates band KAT-TUN plans to tour Asia, with dates in South Korea and Taiwan scheduled. The band will tour without band member Jin Akanishi.

August
 August 6–8 – The Rock in Japan Festival is planned to be held over three days, making it 10 years since the debut of the event.
 August 8 – X Japan intends to perform at the US Lollapalooza festival in Chicago.
 August 7–8 – The Summer Sonic Festival is planned to be held, making it 10 years since the event began.
 August 13–14 – The Rising Sun Rock Festival will be held.
 August 28–29 – Animelo Summer Live 2010 -evolution-

Scheduled events

October
 October 1–31 – Nippon Columbia's month-long celebration of its centennial.
 October 1 – November 6 – Rock band Vamps (formed with Hyde of L'Arc-en-Ciel, K.A.Z of Oblivion Dust) plan to tour the United States, Spain, France, China and Chile. This will be the band's third tour, and the second to be performed overseas (their Vamps Live 2009 tour reached the US and Taiwan).
 October 8–24 – Kokia plans to hold her fifth string of European concerts, with dates in Austria, England, Germany, France, Poland and Russia.

December
 December 30 – The 52nd Japan Record Award is planned.
 December 31 – Annual New Year's music events are planned, such as the 61st Kōhaku Uta Gassen song contest and the 8th Countdown Japan festival.

Debuting artists

Independent artists making major label debuts
Emi Maria
F.T. Island
Galileo Galilei

Momoiro Clover
S/mileage
Sug

Artists resuming activities
The Brilliant Green
Def Tech
Double
Vivian Hsu
Ketsumeishi
Kuroyume
SADS
Tetsuya Komuro
Love Psychedelico
Kanae Matsumoto (as "Utahime Surprise" (歌姫☆サプライズ)
One Ok Rock
Erika Sawajiri
Tetsuya (L'Arc-en-Ciel)
Tina
LUNA SEA

Artists on hiatus
Akina Nakamori
Mika Nakashima
Maki Ohguro
Snowkel
Tohoshinki
Hikaru Utada

Disbanding artists
Rina Aiuchi
Flame
Fumido
High and Mighty Color
Maria
Melon Kinenbi
Surface
Yura Yura Teikoku

Albums released

Top hits on record 

Currently, there are four major charts for song popularity in Japan: Oricon singles charts, Soundscan singles charts, the Billboard Japan Hot 100 and RIAJ digital tracks. Oricon and Soundscan track sales of physical single releases, though Soundscan separates each version of the release (for example, CD+DVD and CD Only versions are tracked separately). The Japan Hot 100 tracks song popularity based on radio airplay and physical single sales data from Soundscan. The RIAJ digital chart tracks the most popular songs downloaded in their entirety from cellphones (Chaku-uta full). No chart exists that tallies PC downloads as of 2010, though the RIAJ certifies PC download releases.

Number-one hits

Top 5 hits

Deaths

January
 January 7 – Minami, 34, vocalist of D-Loop, prescription medicine misdosage.
 January 17 – Maki Asakawa, 68, jazz singer, heart failure.

February
 February 26 – Nujabes, 36, hip-hop track maker, car accident.

March
 March 27 – Hatsumi Shibata, 57, singer, acute heart failure.

May
 May 17 – Osamu Yoshioka, 76, lyricist, acute heart failure.

See also
 2010s in music
 2010 in Japan
 2010 in Japanese television
 List of Japanese films of 2010

References

 
Japan